Mou Khan is a Bangladeshi actress who started her show business career as a model. She made her screen debut in the Film Protishodher Agun (2019), co-starring Zayed Khan. She had previously worked in the films Bandhob and Bahaduri, but the third film in which she worked was the first released. She worked with Director Montazur Rahman Akbar in three films named “Omanush holo Manush, Jemon Jamai Temon Bou & Banglar Hercules with the Legendary co artist Monowar Hossain dipjol. She also worked with famous Director Shaheen Sumon in the web film Mafia.

Filmography

Film

References

Bangladeshi film actresses
21st-century Bangladeshi actresses
Living people
Year of birth missing (living people)

External links